KJNI-LP is a low power radio station broadcasting out of Lake Elsinore, California.

History
KJNI-LP began broadcasting on November 12, 2014.

References

External links

Lake Elsinore, California
2014 establishments in California
JNI-LP
JNI-LP
Radio stations established in 2014
Children's radio stations in the United States